Anika (born Annika Henderson; 6 February 1987 in Surrey, England) is a British and German singer-songwriter, musician, political journalist and poet.

Life and career
Before she began her singing career, Anika was a political journalist who spent her time between Berlin and Bristol, England. She met producer Geoff Barrow (of Portishead), who was looking for a female vocalist to work with his band Beak. Anika joined the band in the studio and recorded nine songs, including a cover of Yoko Ono's "Yang Yang" in 12 days with no overdubs. The result, Anika, was released by Barrow's Invada imprint in Europe and by Stones Throw Records in the U.S. and Japan in October 2010. Anika received positive reviews from contemporary critics; according to the music review aggregation of Metacritic, it garnered an average score of 65/100. The album also included covers of "Terry" by Twinkle, "End of the World" by Skeeter Davis, "Masters of War" by Bob Dylan, and "I Go to Sleep" by Ray Davies.

Geoff Barrow with editor John Minton directed the promotional music video for Anika's cover of "Yang Yang." The song was later offered as the "Free MP3 of the Day" on Spinner. On her choice to cover the song for her album, Anika explained, "I loved the way the words sounded and as an ex-politics student and political journalist, I thought the song would make a great cover. Yoko Ono is renowned for her political views but I think there was a dark side to the lyrics that the original version had not fully explored. This is where we came in ..." Drowned in Sound included "Yang Yang" on its list Singles of the Year 2010.

Several of the songs on Anika found digital success on iTunes. "End of the World" peaked at number seventy-eight on the iTunes Japan Top 100 Alternative Songs,
while "Yang Yang" peaked at number sixty-four on the iTunes Spain Top 100 Alternative Songs. Anika was chosen by Portishead to perform at the ATP I'll Be Your Mirror festivals that they curated in July 2011 at London's Alexandra Palace and in September 2011 in Asbury Park, New Jersey.

Anika later formed the band Exploded View, based in Mexico City, along with local musician / producers, Martin Thulin, Hugo Quezada and Amon Melgarejo who released their self-titled debut album on Sacred Bones Records in 2016. They later released a follow up E.P on the same label entitled ’Summer Came Early’, which was said to be a comment on global warming, in November 2017.

She is also known as a DJ, hosts a radio program on BCR – Berlin Community Radio (Do Not Go Gentle), is seen and heard in experimental cinema and collaborates with a variety of artists and musicians among them Jandek, Shackleton (Woe To The Septic Heart!), Tricky, Michael Rother (Neu!), Dave Clarke (Skint), Andreas Reihse of Kreidler, T.Raumschmiere (Sleeping Pills and Habits), Doireann O'Malley, Ricardo Domeneck, Stine Omar / Max Boss (EASTER), Phillip Geist or Yann Tiersen.

DJ 
Beginning with an anti-DJ performance on the Boiler Room back in 2012, (along with Obi Blanche), the journalist-turned-musician, Anika has shown a veering tendency towards the underground club scene, frequently spinning at some of the world’s most renowned venues.

Past sets include: Tresor (Berlin), TRAICIÓN (Mexico City), Rest (TRADE Berlin), Mono and MN Roy (Mexico City), Melkweg & Trouw (Amsterdam), Berghain (Berlin), Golden Pudel (Hamburg), CTM Festival (Berlin), Dattera til Hagen (Oslo), Santos House Party & Mercury Lounge (NYC), Subtopia (Stockholm), The Sub Club with JD Twitch (Glasgow), and Boiler Room (London and Berlin), amongst others.

Discography

as Anika

Albums
 Anika (Stones Throw / Invada 2010)
 Change (Sacred Bones Records / Invada 2021)

EPs
 Anika EP (Stones Throw / Invada April 2013)

Singles
 "Yang Yang" (Stones Throw / Invada 2010)
 "No One's There" (Stones Throw / Invada 2011)
 "99 Red Balloons" Invada Allstars feat. Anika* (2016) *Charity single for the Anti-trident Campaign
 "No More Parties in the Attic" - Exploded View (Sacred Bones - 2016)
 "Finger Pies" (Stones Throw / Invada 2021)

Album features
 Anika & Camera - 2am (Bureau B - 2014)
 Anika & T.Raumschmiere - Sleeping Pills and Habits (Shitkatapult - 2015)
 Dave Clarke I’m Not Afraid (Feat Anika) (Skint Records 2017) from the Dave Clarke LP The Desecration Of Desire
 Tricky - Lonely Dancer (Feat Anika) ([False Idols] 2020) from Tricky 2020 EP
 I Like Trains - Eyes To The Left (Feat Anika) (Atlantic Curve 2020) from I Like Trains KOMPROMAT

with Exploded View

Albums
 Exploded View - Exploded View (Sacred Bones 2016)
 Exploded View - Obey (Sacred Bones 2018)

EPs
 Summer Came Early EP - Exploded View (Sacred Bones 2017)

with Shackleton

Albums
 Behind the Glass - Shackleton with Anika (Woe To The Septic Heart! July 2017)

References

External links
Official USA site
Official Tumblr
Official Bandcamp

1987 births
Living people
Stones Throw Records artists
Portishead (band)
Musicians from Berlin
Musicians from Bristol
Place of birth missing (living people)
German electronic musicians
British political journalists
German political writers
German singer-songwriters